The 2016 Empire Slovak Open was a professional tennis tournament played on outdoor clay courts. It was the eighth edition of the tournament and part of the 2016 ITF Women's Circuit, offering a total of $100,000 in prize money. It took place in Trnava, Slovakia, on 9–15 May 2016.

Singles main draw entrants

Seeds 

 1 Rankings as of 2 May 2016.

Other entrants 
The following players received wildcards into the singles main draw:
  Anna Blinkova
  Viktória Kužmová
  Tereza Mihalíková
  Rebecca Šramková

The following players received entry from the qualifying draw:
  Nicoleta Dascălu
  Lenka Juríková
  Markéta Vondroušová
  Dayana Yastremska

The following players received entry by lucky loser spots:
  Arantxa Rus
  Viktoriya Tomova

The following player received entry by a protected ranking:
  Yuliya Beygelzimer

Champions

Singles

 Kateřina Siniaková def.  Anastasija Sevastova, 7–6(7–4), 5–7, 6–0

Doubles

 Anna Kalinskaya /  Tereza Mihalíková def.  Evgeniya Rodina /  Anastasija Sevastova, 6–1, 7–6(7–4)

External links 
 2016 Empire Slovak Open at ITFtennis.com
 Official website

2016 ITF Women's Circuit
2016 in Slovak tennis
Tennis tournaments in Slovakia